Gaulois was a  74-gun ship of the line of the French Navy.

Career 

At the Bourbon Restoration in 1814, she returned to Brest, where she was decommissioned. She was struck in 1827 and eventually broken up in 1831.

Notes, citations, and references

Notes

Citations

References
 

Winfield, Rif & Stephen S Roberts (2015) French Warships in the Age of Sail 1786 - 1861: Design Construction, Careers and Fates. (Seaforth Publishing). 

Ships of the line of the French Navy
Téméraire-class ships of the line
1812 ships